Douglas James St. Onge (February 14, 1934 – July 11, 2021) was an American politician in the state of Minnesota. He served in the Minnesota House of Representatives from 1973-1979 and 1983-1985. St. Onge was born in Saint Paul, Minnesota and graduated from Washington High School in Brainerd, Minnesota. He went to University of North Dakota, Bemidji State University and, College of Saint Benedict and Saint John's University in Collegeville, Minnesota. He taught in high school and owned a plumbing business in Bemidji, Minnesota.

References

1934 births
2021 deaths
Politicians from Saint Paul, Minnesota
People from Bemidji, Minnesota
Businesspeople from Minnesota
American plumbers
Educators from Minnesota
Democratic Party members of the Minnesota House of Representatives
College of Saint Benedict and Saint John's University alumni
Bemidji State University alumni
University of North Dakota alumni